Krasnodar Rora (23 March 1945 – 12 November 2020) was a Croatian professional football player and manager.

Club career
Rising through the ranks at Šibenik, Rora rose to prominence as a key player of the local powerhouse Dinamo Zagreb in the late 1960s and early 1970s, and was part of the club's golden generation which won the 1967 Inter-Cities Fairs Cup, the team's first and only European silverware.

After turning 28, the minimum legal age for Yugoslav players to move abroad, he played for Standard Liège in Belgium under fellow Yugoslavs Vlatko Marković and Nedeljko Bulatović, before moving on to France in 1975 where he spent two seasons at AS Nancy alongside the young Michel Platini under coach Antoine Redin.

International career
Rora also earned five caps for Yugoslavia in 1967 and 1968, under the tenure of national manager Rajko Mitić, alongside several of his Dinamo teammates from the 1967 Inter-Cities Fairs Cup final such as Rudolf Belin, Mladen Ramljak, and Slaven Zambata. However, the only two Dinamo players Mitić eventually called up for the UEFA Euro 1968 final four tournament in June were Belin and Ramljak, with Yugoslavia eventually winning the silver medal. His final international was an October 1968 World Cup qualification match against Spain.

Post-playing career
Rora retired from playing in 1978 at the age of 33 after a single season with a small French second-level side SR Hagenau under manager Raymond Hild, where he helped them win the regional Alsace Cup.  

He then moved back to his homeland and worked as a youth coach at Dinamo Zagreb and also had managerial stints at smaller Croatian clubs Radnik Velika Gorica, Cibalia, as well as his original club Šibenik.

Personal life

Death
He died on 12 November 2020 in Zagreb, aged 75.

Honours
Dinamo Zagreb
Inter-Cities Fairs Cup: 1966–67
Yugoslav Football Cup: 1964–65, 1968–69

References

External links
 
Profile on Football Association of Serbia official website

1945 births
2020 deaths
People from Vis (island)
Sportspeople from Šibenik
Association football midfielders
Yugoslav footballers
Yugoslavia international footballers
HNK Šibenik players
GNK Dinamo Zagreb players
Standard Liège players
AS Nancy Lorraine players
FCSR Haguenau players
Yugoslav First League players
Ligue 1 players
Belgian Pro League players
Yugoslav expatriate footballers
Expatriate footballers in Belgium
Yugoslav expatriate sportspeople in Belgium
Expatriate footballers in France
Yugoslav expatriate sportspeople in France
Croatian football managers
HNK Šibenik managers
HNK Cibalia managers